Events in the year 1855 in Portugal.

Incumbents
 Monarch: Peter V
 Prime Minister: João Carlos Saldanha de Oliveira Daun, 1st Duke of Saldanha

Events

Arts and entertainment

O Pobre Rabequista (The Poor Rabeca Player), oil painting by José Rodrigues

Sports
Oporto Cricket and Lawn Tennis Club founded

Births

14 February – João Franco, politician (d. 1929)
13 March – António Osório Sarmento de Figueiredo Jr., nobleman, jurist, politician and magistrate. (d. 1935)
23 September – Abel Botelho, diplomat, writer and military officer (d. 1917).

Full date missing 
Amélia dos Santos Costa Cardia, physician (d. 1938).

Deaths

References

 
1850s in Portugal
Portugal
Years of the 19th century in Portugal
Portugal